The parachuting tournaments in air sports at the 2005 World Games in Duisburg was played between 15 and 17 July. Parachuters from 19 nations, participated in the tournament. The parachuting competition took place in Toeppersee Nordufer Duisburg.

Participating nations

Medal table

Events

References

External links
 Fédération Aéronautique Internationale
 Air sports on IWGA website
 Results

2005 World Games
2005